The HTC Wildfire S is a smartphone developed by the HTC Corporation. The model was announced on 15 February 2011 at the Mobile World Congress and released in Europe three months later.

On 14 August 2019, it was announced that the "HTC Wildfire" name had been licensed for use on the HTC Wildfire X, a phone manufactured by a third-party company and intended for the Indian market.

Hardware and software
HTC Wildfire S is considered to be an update of 2010's HTC Wildfire, having a newer, 600 MHz processor by Qualcomm, support for the faster Bluetooth 3.0 specification, and a screen with double the resolution (HVGA, updated from QVGA).

The Wildfire S includes a TFT LCD capacitive touchscreen and a 5-megapixel camera.

Unlike its predecessor, the Wildfire S has no trackball or trackpad.

The device runs on Android 2.3.5 Gingerbread, and comes with an upgrade to HTC's Sense UI.

However, by rooting, the user is able to install CyanogenMod versions of Android 4.0, 4.1 and even 4.4.

Availability

In the United Kingdom, the Wildfire S is available from several carriers, including 3 (Hutchison 3G), Vodafone, Orange, Tesco Mobile, T-Mobile and O2.

In the United States, it is available through carriers US Cellular, T-Mobile, Virgin Mobile USA and MetroPCS; in Canada through Bell Canada and Virgin Mobile Canada; in Australia through Telstra; in New Zealand through Telecom New Zealand; and in India it is available in open market.

In Ireland, it is available through networks Meteor, eMobile, Vodafone, O2, 3 (Hutchison 3G), and Tesco Mobile.

In Bulgaria, it is available through networks Mobiltel, GLOBUL and Vivacom.

In Pakistan, it is available throughout in market and uses networks are Telenor, Ufone, Jazz and Zong.

See also
 Comparison of smartphones
 Galaxy Nexus
 HTC Sense

References

External links
 Official Page

Android (operating system) devices
HTC smartphones
Mobile phones introduced in 2011
Discontinued smartphones
Mobile phones with user-replaceable battery